Michael "Mike" Wazowski is a fictional character who appears in Disney/Pixar's Monsters Inc. franchise. He is a green one-eyed round monster with two arms, legs, and small horns. In the films, Mike is one of the two protagonists, alongside James P. Sullivan, and is primarily voiced by Billy Crystal in the film series, shorts, and the Disney+ series.

Conception and creation
In early versions of the film, Mike had not yet been added. Later on in development when he was added, his early designs consisted of no arms and his size was smaller with a more aggressive attitude. Billy Crystal, having regretted turning down the part of Buzz Lightyear years prior, accepted that of Mike.

Appearances

Monsters University

On a class field trip to Monsters, Inc., Mike is inspired to become a professional scarer. He gets accepted into the Monsters University scare program, where he meets both James P. Sullivan and Randall Boggs in a SCARE 101 class. Mike initially dislikes Sulley for his arrogance and bad work ethic. He likes Randall because he's a Scaring major and his roommate at the time. It is seen that Randall and Mike hangout a lot by studying and even sitting next to each other in class. After failing the class, Mike works out a deal with the school's dean to re-enroll in the program on the stipulation that he wins the Scare Games. Sulley joins Mike, despite Mike's protests.

Mike and Sulley join the Oozma Kappa fraternity to qualify for the Games. Mike and Sulley begin to build a friendship as they compete together. During the final event, Sulley cheats. Mike is devastated his team won by cheating and later breaks into the door-lab to unsuccessfully collect a child's scream before Sulley saves him. These actions result in both Mike and Sulley being expelled from school. After being expelled, the two apply as workers in the Monsters, Inc. mailroom. They advance through the ranks until Sully becomes a scarer with Mike as his assistant.

Monsters, Inc.

Mike runs Sulley's station on the scare floor and they are close friends and roommates. Mike is in a relationship with Celia Mae at this time. Additionally, Mike helps Sulley in his mission to save Boo. While Sulley bonds with Boo, Mike desperately wants her gone. Randall finds out his involvement from the glimpse of him near Boo in a newspaper and Mike makes a deal with him to return Boo. However, this makes Sulley suspicious and Mike tries to prove him wrong. Randall ends up kidnapping Mike for the scream extractor. At the last second, Mike is saved from the extractor by Sulley and after he and Sulley foil Randall's plot, they report Waternoose's involvement in the scheme to the CDA.

Monsters at Work

Following the arrest of Waternoose, Mike and Sulley are put  in charge of Monsters, Inc. He works as Jokester and trains former scarers to be Jokesters.

In other media

Other films
Mike made a cameo appearance at the end of the credits of Finding Nemo (2003), diving on the seabed.

Video games
As one of the main characters of the Monsters, Inc. franchise, Mike has regular appearances in the video games of the franchise, usually as a playable character.

He also made appearances in other Disney crossover video games, such as the Disney Infinity series (2013-2015), where as with the other playable characters in the game a tie-in figure for him was also released, Kingdom Hearts III (2019), appearing as one of Sora's party members, and Disney Mirrorverse (2022), where he is depicted wearing combat armor.

Reception
Mike's character has been generally well received by critics and audiences. JP Baker, an editor for The Badlands on Medium'''s website, noted the importance of reaching one's dreams, and how the character's arc in the film Monsters University tied into this as it dealt with these ambitions as well as how he overcame the obstacles that came in his way. Rolling Stone considers him the 8th best Pixar character, going on to state "It's weird to think of a lumpy green thing as an everyman, but Billy Crystal's voice helps make Mike a monster of the people." Additionally Victoria Robertson from ScreenRant listed him as the 7th best Pixar character, stating "perhaps it's the little quirks that make him so great, his skittishness, despite the fact that he's a monster, or his comical and romantic qualities that shine throughout the film, but whatever it is, Wazowski made a name for himself."

Legacy
Mike has appeared in a wide variety of various internet memes. One such example is the face-swap meme, where Sulley's face is photoshopped onto Mike, as well as "Mike Wazowski explaining things" where Mike is shown complaining to Sulley and Roz about the games in the rec room, taken from a cutscene in the 2001 Disney Interactive game Monsters Inc. Rec Room Arcade. Mike and Sulley were planned to be featured in the convention hall scenes in Chip 'n Dale: Rescue Rangers'', but they were replaced with He-Man and Skeletor.

References

Animated characters in film
Animated characters introduced in 2001
Fictional business executives
Fictional college students
Fictional comedians
Fictional cyclopes
Fictional factory workers
Film characters introduced in 2001
Film and television memes
Internet memes
Male characters in animation
Male characters in animated films
Male characters in film
Monsters, Inc.
Pixar characters